Elisabeth of Hanau ( – 25 May 1475) was a daughter of Lord Ulrich V and his wife, Countess Elisabeth of Ziegenhain.  She died on 25 May 1475 and was buried in the Gnadental monastery in Michelfeld.

Inheritance of Ziegenhain 
Through her marriage to Albert I of Hohenlohe strengthened, Elisabeth strengthened the family relations between the House of Hohenlohe and the Counts of Ziegenhain, which had begun when her maternal aunt Agnes of Ziegenhain (d. 1399) had married Count Kraft IV of Hohenlohe-Weikersheim.

John II, the last Count of Ziegenhain, died in 1450 without a male heir.  The county of Ziegenhain had been a fief of Hesse since 1437, so Hesse declared that it was a completed fief and occupied the county militarily.  The House of Hohenlohe, however, asserted that they were the closest male heir, as their son descended from the Counts of Ziegenhain via Elisabeth.  Using this argument, the Hoholohe family convinced Emperor Frederick III to enfeoff them with the County of Ziegenhain as an imperial fief, thereby raising them to the status of imperial counts.  This led to a lengthy dispute, which lasted until 1495.  In the end, Hesse won and Ziegenhain remained a part of the Landgraviate.  Nevertheless, Albert I and his descendants retained the title of count and the status of imperial count and added the six-pointed star of Ziegenhain to their coat of arms.

Inheritance of Lichtenberg 
Elisabeth's daughter, also named Elisabeth, married Louis V of Lichtenberg.  Their daughter Anna (1442-1474) married Count Philip "the Elder", the first Count of Hanau-Babenhausen.  In 1480, James of Lichtenberg, the last Lord of Lichtenberg, died without a male heir.  His inheritance was divided between Philip the Elder and Count Simon Wecker of Zweibrücken-Bitsch, who was married to Anna's sister, who was also named Elisabeth.  This inheritance brought Hanau-Babenhausen a considerable amount of territory, most of it in the Alsace and it became almost as large as Hanau-Münzenberg.  Hanau-Babenhausen then changed its name to Hanau-Lichtenberg.

Marriage and issue 
In 1413, Elisabeth married 1413 Albert I, Count of Hohenlohe.  They had the following children:
 Kraft V (1429 – 31 March 1472), Count of Hohenlohe
 George (1417-1470)
 Albert II (d. 1490), Count of hohenlohe
 Elisabeth (d. 24 December 1488), married:
 Louis V, Lord of Lichtenberg
 Hugo XIII, Count of Montfort-Rotenfels-Langenargen (d. 16 October 1491)
 Anna (d. 8 September 1440), a nun at Klarenthal Abbey
 Adelheid, (d. 1426), a nun, probably also at Klarenthal Abbey
 Agneta, (d. 1426), a nun, probably also at Klarenthal Abbey

References 
 Barbara Susanne Schöner: Die rechtliche Stellung der Frauen des Hauses Hohenlohe, thesis, 1963
 Reinhard Suchier: "Genealogie des Hanauer Grafenhauses", in: Festschrift des Hanauer Geschichtsvereins zu seiner fünfzigjährigen Jubelfeier am 27. August 1894, Hanau, 1894
 Gerhard Taddey: "Wie die Hohenloher Grafen wurden", in: Beiträge zur Landeskunde. Regelmäßige Beilage zum Staatsanzeiger für Baden-Württemberg, vol. 5, 1976, p. 1−9
 Ernst J. Zimmermann, Hanau Stadt und Land, 3rd ed., Hanau, 1919, reprinted 1978

Footnotes 

House of Hanau
Countesses of Hohenlohe
House of Hohenlohe
14th-century births
Year of birth unknown
1475 deaths
15th-century German people
15th-century German women